is a passenger railway station in located in the city of Kōka,  Shiga Prefecture, Japan, operated by the private railway operator Ohmi Railway.

Lines
Minakuchi Station is served by the Ohmi Railway Main Line, and is located 43.8 rail kilometers from the terminus of the line at Maibara Station.

Station layout
The station consists of two unnumbered opposed side platforms connect to the station building by a level crossing. The station is unattended.

Platforms

Adjacent stations

History
Minakuchi Station was opened on December 28, 1900

Passenger statistics
In fiscal 2018, the station was used by an average of 348 passengers daily.

Surroundings
 Japan National Route 1
 Japan National Route 307
Shiga Prefectural Mizuguchi Higashi Junior and Senior High School
 Koka City Shiroyama Junior High School

See also
List of railway stations in Japan

References

External links

 Ohmi Railway official site 

Railway stations in Shiga Prefecture
Railway stations in Japan opened in 1900
Kōka, Shiga